The 1952 Humboldt State Lumberjacks football team represented Humboldt State College during the 1952 college football season. Humboldt State competed in the Far Western Conference (FWC).

The 1952 Lumberjacks were led by second-year head coach Phil Sarboe. They played home games at both the Redwood Bowl in Arcata, California and Albee Stadium in Eureka, California. Humboldt State finished as conference champion, with a record of seven wins and one loss (7–1, 3–0 FWC). The Lumberjacks outscored their opponents 266–53 for the season, an average score of 33–7. The defense yielded more than a touchdown in only one game.

Schedule

Notes

References

Humboldt State
Humboldt State Lumberjacks football seasons
Northern California Athletic Conference football champion seasons
Humboldt State Lumberjacks football